2018 FC Tokyo season.

Squad
As of 14 January 2018.

Out on loan

J1 League

League table

Matches

References

External links
 J.League official site

FC Tokyo
FC Tokyo seasons